Karwacki (feminine: Karwacka; plural: Karwaccy) is a surname of Polish language origin. People with this surname include:

 David Karwacki (born 1965), Canadian politician
 Krysten Karwacki (born 1991), Canadian curler
 Marlena Karwacka (born 1997), Polish racing cyclist
 Robert L. Karwacki, American judge

See also
 
 Wyrąb Karwacki, a village in the administrative district of Gmina Przasnysz, within Przasnysz County, Masovian Voivodeship, Poland

Surnames of Polish origin
Polish-language surnames